Acrocercops leucostega is a moth of the family Gracillariidae. It is known from Sierra Leone.

References

leucostega
Moths of Africa
Moths described in 1932